Bala Murugan, better known by his stage name Gana Bala is an Indian playback singer in Tamil cinema. He rose to prominence after rendering the songs 'Aadi Pona Aavani' and 'Nadukadalula Kappala' from the soundtrack of Attakathi. He has predominantly sung songs belonging to the gaana genre of Tamil Nadu. He has been credited for reviving the gaana genre in Tamil Cinema after 'Thenisai Thendral' Deva. He has also penned lyrics for some of his songs.

Career 
Bala first tripped on 'Gaana' when he was in high school. He gained confidence as a Gaana singer when he joined Presidency College, Chennai to study Botany. He later contested in the TV reality show Gana Kuyil Pattu that featured on Kalaignar TV and won it. He has worked on a number of devotional albums and also performed on stage. One of his independent albums, Vaanavil was released by composers Deva and Dhina. He made his debut in the film industry with Piragu composed by Srikanth Deva, son of the 'Father of Gaana Genre' – Deva. He first found success for his songs 'Aadi Pona Aavani' and 'Nadukadalula' in the sleeper hit Attakathi. Since then he has sung a number of successful songs under top composers like Yuvan Shankar Raja and G. V. Prakash Kumar.

He has also sung a jingle with composer G. V. Prakash Kumar to mark the 10th anniversary celebrations of Radio Mirchi Chennai.

Other works

Film work 
Apart from singing, Bala has also featured in some of his songs. He has also appeared in a minor role as a mechanic in his debut film Piragu. He has danced for a song in 'Attakathi' Dinesh's second movie as hero, Vaaraayo Vennilaave. At the audio launch of Vikraman's Ninaithathu Yaaro, Bala expressed interest in acting and his desire to become a hero. He will soon turn hero in a film to be directed by K. Selva Bharathy titled Parry's Corner. The film is said to ponder over the fact that while migrants to Chennai hit it big, Chennai-ties still live mediocre lives. Bala will be playing a cycle rickshaw driver.

Philanthropy 
Bala is a law graduate and works as an advocate. He has contested local municipal elections twice as an independent candidate, losing only by slender margins. Bala, who identifies himself as an Ambedkarite, says,

Filmography

As playback singer 
Films

 The films are listed in order that the film released, regardless of the dates the music released.
Television

As lyricist

As actor

Awards

References

External links 
 
 

Living people
1970 births
Tamil playback singers
Tamil film poets
Tamil-language lyricists
Indian male singer-songwriters
Indian singer-songwriters
Indian male playback singers
Singers from Chennai
20th-century Indian singers
20th-century Indian male singers